Mostar is city and municipality in Bosnia and Herzegovina.

Mostar may also refer to:

 Mostar (magazine), Turkish monthly magazine
 HT Mostar, a telecommunications company from Bosnia and Herzegovina
 Istočni Mostar, a village and municipality in Republika Srpska, Bosnia and Herzegovina
 Mostar (mobile radio), Motorola two-way radio, see List of Motorola products#Mobile radios

See also
 Diocese of Mostar (disambiguation)